The regalia of Norway are items that symbolise the Norwegian monarch's power and majesty. Little is known of the old Norwegian regalia which have since been lost. The majority of the modern regalia date from 1818 and were made for the coronation of Jean Bernadotte as King Carl III Johan.

The Norwegian royal regalia include nine items: the king's crown, the sword of the realm, the king's sceptre, the king's orb, the queen's crown, the queen's sceptre, the queen's orb, the crown of the crown prince and the anointing horn. Also in this collection are several mantles, two banners of the realm and coronation thrones.

The last king and queen in Norway to be crowned were Haakon VII and his wife Maud of Wales in 1905. Thereafter, the regalia have since not been used to physically crown or to be worn by successive monarchs. Certain items are still used occasionally such as during the monarch's consecration, where the crown is displayed; or during the monarch's funeral service, where it is placed atop the casket.

History
During Norway's union with Denmark, the king underwent a coronation ceremony in Denmark. When this union was dissolved in 1814, Norway declared its independence and adopted its own constitution. However, total independence was short-lived as Norway would be compelled to enter into a personal union with Sweden and sharing the same monarch and foreign policy.

A coronation was required among the provisions in Norway's 1814 constitution. The old Norwegian regalia had been lost and no Norwegian regalia was available for use when preparations were made for the coronation of King Carl Johan in 1818. The king would pay for the essential regalia himself. The regalia of the king and the anointing horn were made for this coronation. The regalia of the queen were acquired in 1830 for the planned coronation of Carl Johan's wife, Désirée Clary. This coronation never took place. All the regalia were made in Sweden except the crown of the crown prince which was made in Norway in 1848 and the sword of state which was a gift from Charles John to the Norwegian state. The coronet of the crown prince was ordered for use in the planned coronation of Oscar I and Josephine of Leuchtenberg, as the Norwegian parliament wanted the heir apparent to the throne, the future Charles IV to take part in the ceremony. However Oscar I was never to be crowned in Norway because the bishop of Nidaros refused to crown the Catholic Josephine. The sword of state was initially a gift from Napoleon Bonaparte to Charles III John, then known as Jean-Baptiste Bernadotte, when he was appointed Marshal of France. Charles III John carried the sword during the Battle of Leipzig; when he acquired the Norwegian regalia in 1818, he had the blade of the sword refashioned, in order that its symbolic language might correspond better to its new function.

The coronation that followed Charles III John's was that of Charles IV and his wife, Louise of the Netherlands, in 1860. Oscar II and Sophie of Nassau were crowned in 1873.

Following the dissolution of the union with Sweden in 1905, Norway elected a Danish prince to serve as its own king. King Haakon VII, his wife Maud, and their son Olav arrived in Norway on 25 November and Haakon took the required oath as King two days later. As required by the constitution, Haakon (along with his wife) was subsequently crowned and anointed the following year on 22 June 1906 at the Nidaros Cathedral in Trondheim. This was the last time the regalia were to be used for a coronation as the provision in the Norwegian constitution requiring the monarch's coronation was repealed in 1908. The coronet of the crown prince has never been used: Crown Prince Olav was too young to participate in the ceremony in 1906.

The regalia are now on display in the Archbishop's Palace, next to the Nidaros Cathedral. Certain items from the regalia collection are still used occasionally such as during the monarch's consecration, where the crown is displayed; or during the monarch's funeral service, where it is placed atop the casket.

In 2006, Harald V made a speech where he emphasised that the Norwegian Crown symbolises a free, independent and democratic nation.

Individual items in the regalia 

 The King's Crown: made in Stockholm in 1818 by goldsmith Olof Wihlborg, the crown is a corona clausa (closed model) of gold consisting of a circlet bearing eight large stones, primarily amethysts and chrysoprases surrounded by a wreath of oak leaves with three pearls set as acorns between each of these stones, the largest of these being a large oval green tourmaline, a gift of the Brazilian consul in Stockholm to King Charles III Johan in the front.  From on the rim of this circlet are eight gold strawberry leaves, each set with a precious or semi-precious stone (except that covered by the large tourmaline in the front), between which are set eight pairs of gold oak leaves with pearl set acorn between them.  From behind these strawberry leaves rises eight half arches, four of them being each set with four precious or semi-precious stones alternating with four pairs of oak leaves and pairs of pearls and the other four half arches consisting of gold branches of laurel leaves.  These half-arches support a monde of blue enamel sprinkled with gold stars and surround by an equator and meridian band of half-pearls and supporting at its top a Latin cross of six amethysts.  Among the other precious and semi-precious stones set in the crown are an emerald, a ruby, a topaz, an alexandrite and a white opal.  The crown is lined with a red velvet cap covered with pearls alternating with small crowns embroidered in gold thread.
 King's orb: made in Stockholm in 1818 by goldsmith Adolf Zethelius (1781–1864) is a 10 cm sphere of gilt silver and with a 1 cm wide equator and meridian decorated with small roses.  The King's orb is footed and at the top the meridian bears a miniature orb and cross.
 King's sceptre: made in Stockholm in 1818 by goldsmith Adolf Zethelius is a 75 cm rod of gilt silver.  At the top of this rod is a diminutive orb and cross, immediately below which it is surrounded with open work foliage of oak leaves, while the knobs on either side of the grip are decorated with the roses similar to those found on the King's orb.
 Anointing horn: made in Stockholm in 1818 by goldsmith Adolf Zethelius of gilt silver and has the form of upturned and footed bull's horn with the open end closed with a chained lid topped with an acorn and with a miniature royal crown on the tip of the horn.  It was obviously inspired by the anointing horn in the Swedish regalia, which also has the form of an upturned and footed bull's horn.
 Sword of the Realm: Made in the early 19th century. Tradition has it that it was a gift from Napoleon Bonaparte to the future king of Sweden and Norway, Jean-Baptiste Bernadotte, when he was made Marshal of France, and which he carried as Swedish Crown Prince at the battle of Leipzig. He had a new hilt, grip and scabbard in gilt bronze made for this sword, appropriate to its new use as the Norwegian Sword of the Realm. Inlaid panels of mother of pearl decorate the grip and scabbard. Engravings of oak leaves on the scabbard, hilt and grip and an acorn at the tip of the grip correspond to the oak leaves and acorns also found on the crown and sceptre.
 Queen's crown: made in Stockholm in 1830 by goldsmith Erik Lundberg, and modelled after the Swedish queen consort's crown. The crown is a corona clausa consisting of a gold circlet of eight larger stones (two amethysts, four topazes and two chrysoprases) alternating with eight smaller stones (amethysts) with rosettes of seven small pearls between each of these and surrounded by an engraved design of roses leaves.  On the rim of this circlet rises eight leaves, each set with a round amethyst, alternating with eight large half pearls.  From behind these leaves rises eight half arches of a leaf design, each set with seven progressively smaller oval amethysts (except the first stone in the front half arch which is set with a rectangler topaz) and supporting at the top, on a row of small pearls, a monde of blue enamel with an equator and meridian band of small pearls supporting a pearl cross at the top.  The crown is lined with a red velvet cap with seed pearls embroidered in a branch-like design behind each of the large half pearls on the rim of the circlet and at the top of the cap, an eight pointed star shaped gold button set with a large pearl.
 Queen's orb: made in Stockholm in 1830 is a 10 cm sphere of gilt silver with a 1 cm equator and meridian set with faceted amethysts.  The Queen's orb is footed and on the top the meridian bears a miniature blue enamelled orb with an equator and meridian band set with small pearls bearing at its top a cross also set with small pearls.
 Queen's sceptre: made in Stockholm in 1830 is a 70 cm rod of gilt silver.  At its head the rod is set with four rows of five faceted oval amethysts, diminishing in size from bottom to top, encased between four acanthus leaves. From each of four large scrolls below this head and from four smaller scrolls above it hang drop shaped pendant each set with a drop-shaped amethyst, the scrolls, pendants and their amethysts below being significantly larger than those above.  The grip of the Queen's sceptre has a banister-like shape embossed with design of acanthus leaves.
 Crown Prince's coronet: made in Norway in 1846 by goldsmith Herman Colbjørnsen Øyset. The coronet is a corona aperta (open model), clearly modelled in its basic design on that of the Swedish Crown Prince's coronet, and made of gold and decorated with amethysts, citrines, peridots and rare Norwegian freshwater pearls.  The circlet is polished with acanthus ornamentation with a matte finish around the gemstones alternating with groups of three oak leaves set in a fan shape around a pearl.  At the front of the circlet is an oval amethyst and four amethysts alternate with four citrines on the circlet proper.  The eight triangular points of this radial crown are in a matte finish with similar acanthus ornamentation, while between each of these points they are joined to each other on either side and to the circlet itself with a pair of acanthus scrolls supporting a group of five oak leaves around a pearl similar to those on the circlet.  Each of the points has two oval colored gemstones, one an amethyst, the other a peridot, the lower one being slightly larger than that above it with a small pearl above them.  At the top of each point is a larger Norwegian freshwater half pearl in a trefoil setting.  It is lined with a red velvet cap heavily embroidered in gold thread with the design of a large radiating star at the top surrounded by four pairs of acanthus scrolls.

See also 
 Crown jewels
 Royal coronations in Norway
 Norwegian monarchy
 Coat of arms of Norway

Footnotes

External links 
 Home page of the Norwegian Royal Regalia
 Nidaros Cathedral | The Crown Regalia
 Royal House of Norway | The Regalia
 Short video from NRK of the Royal family visiting the exhibit of the Royal Regalia

Crowns (headgear)
Norway
House of Bernadotte
National symbols of Norway
Norwegian monarchy
Norway
Trondheim